Sumerian Comics is an American comic book publisher based in Los Angeles, California. The company was founded in 2020 by Nathan Yocum and Ryan Swanson as Behemoth Comics. The comic division sells over half a million (500,000+) comics yearly, reached 8th in total market share in 2021, and has worked on titles with Ubisoft, Netflix, among others. Their titles are currently distributed globally by Simon & Schuster & Diamond Comic Distributors. They've released works in other industries, like video games on Steam, PlayStation 5, Xbox Series X/S, and other platforms. As of 2022, the company is owned by Sumerian Records and was subsequently renamed as Sumerian Comics in July 2022.

History

2020–2022: Behemoth
Founded in 2020 after acquiring the Spain-based comic book publisher, Amigo Comics, Behemoth Comics debuted in the March Previews catalog for Diamond Comic Distributors. Owing to the COVID-19 pandemic and Diamond shutting down its distribution services for a brief period, Behemoth's first titles were not released until July 2020. On May 25, 2020 Bloody Disgusting announced that Behemoth would be releasing a spin-off of the popular video game series, Hotline Miami. The title, Hotline Miami: Wildlife is an 8-part series that was released monthly beginning in September 2020.

In November 2020, Bleeding Cool announced that A Girl Walks Home Alone at Night #1, written by film Director, Ana Lily Amirpour had sold through at least 10,000 copies of its first printing and would receive a second printing before the first issues releases. Shortly after Publishers Weekly and Graphic Policy revealed that Behemoth had signed a global distribution deal with Simon & Schuster and received managed publisher status with Amazon, Kindle, and ComiXology. The article also revealed that they acquired Film and TV representation for a portion of their books by the Hollywood-based Talent Agency, Grandview/Automatik founded by notable Film Producer, Brian Kavanaugh-Jones (Insidious, Sinister, Upgrade). The deal with Simon & Schuster would only cover trade paperbacks for the global market meanwhile Diamond Comic Distributors would still distribute their comic books and graphic novels to hobby stores around the globe.

On February 22, 2021, as part of the Comic Industry's Annual Publisher and Retailer conference, ComicsPro, Behemoth announced that it would publish the comic MFKZ, which was adapted and released as a film on Netflix. Shortly after the conference it was revealed that You Promised Me Darkness #1 had sold through 55,000 copies, marking the publisher's best selling first issue to date alongside MFKZ #1, which reached 40,000 copies sold. The company was revealed as a sponsor for the 2021 Fangoria Chainsaw Awards.

Leading off a wave of new licensed titles, Bloody Disgusting, GamesRadar+, and others revealed that Behemoth would be adapting the 2015 cult film, Turbo Kid into a prequel comic book series due to be released in September, 2021. This was followed by IGN revealing that Ubisoft and Behemoth had partnered for a comic book series based on Watch Dogs: Legion with the first issue being released November 3, 2021.

At the end of 2021, Behemoth revealed that they had surpassed half a million (500,000+) comics and graphic novels sold during the year; their first full year of operation.

At the end of 2021, Syfy and others revealed a comic by Behemoth called Kult Cable. Meant to be the lead in to a full series featuring more celebrities, the comic includes New Jersey hip-hop and punk group, Ho99o9 and the famous actor, Jack Black. The comic is a tie-in to the bands variety show of the same name that features well-known guests each episode.

On January 25, 2022, the entertainment website GamesRadar+ previewed a new licensed series from Behemoth based on the open-world RPG video game, Kingdom Come: Deliverance.

Behemoth Interactive published Blank Frame, a psychological horror game on Steam to positive reviews. Both the standard and soundtrack editions of the game released on January 28, 2022. A second game, Meat Saw released the follow month and accrued 20,000 downloads within the first two weeks.

2022-present: Sumerian

Deadline Hollywood reported on March 23, 2022, that the record label Sumerian Records and their film division, Sumerian Films acquired Behemoth.

Deadline Hollywood reported the following week that Behemoth's original series, Paranormal Hitmen from creators Brett Murphy and Wilson Gandolpho is set to be adapted by Entertainment One and Hasbro into a TV series.

In July 2022, Behemoth was renamed as Sumerian Comics.

As part of the first titles announced under their new name, Billboard revealed that one of the best-selling Latin musicians of all time would be partnering with Sumerian for an action-packed comic book. Ozuna stated, “I love collaborating to take my creativity to new, interesting places,” Ozuna said in a statement. “I’m very excited to partner with the talented team at Sumerian and make something fresh, captivating, and fun for my fans and my culture.”

Subsidiaries

Amigo Comics 
Founded in Spain in 2012 by Juan "El" Torres, Amigo Comics is known for collecting Juan's series previously published by Image Comics such as Nancy in Hell and Drums. Amigo also published other creator-owned and licensed titles that Juan was not involved in a creative capacity. In 2019 Amigo was nominated for an Eisner Award in the Best Archival Collection/Project—Strips category for their title Sky Masters of the Space Force: The Complete Sunday Strips in Color. On February 24, 2020, it was announced that Amigo was acquired by Behemoth Comics and all future titles would be published in the US by Behemoth but would still carry the Amigo brand. This enabled Juan to focus solely on his titles.

Sumerian Comics publications

Best selling licensed titles
MFKZ #1-6 (June 23, 2021 - November 24, 2021) 40,000+ sold
Hotline Miami: Wildlife #1-8 (September 23, 2020 - April 7, 2021) 20,000+ sold
A Girl Walks Home Alone at Night #1-2 (November 18, 2020 - December 16, 2020) 20,000+ sold

Other notable licensed titles
Spare Parts #0 (July 14, 2021)
Turbo Kid #1-2 (September 29, 2021 - October 27, 2021)
Watch Dogs: Legion #1-4 (November 3, 2021 - February 2, 2022)
Kult Cable: ft. Ho99o9 & Jack Black (May 07, 2022)
Kingdom Come: Deliverance #1-4 (June 22, 2022)

Best selling original titles
You Promised Me Darkness #1-5 (April 14, 2021 - August 15, 2021) 55,000+ sold
Until My Knuckles Bleed #1-3 (January, 2022 - March, 2022) 20,000+ sold

Other notable original titles
Necromorfus #1-4 (October, 2020 - January, 2021)
Paranormal Hitmen #1-4 (February, 2021 - May, 2021)
Nancy in Hell Vol. 1: The Long Road (June, 2021)
Osaka Mime Vol. 1 (May, 2021)
Freak Snow #1-4 (May, 2021 - August, 2021) 10,000+ sold
Cinnamon #1-3 (July, 2021 - September, 2021)
Pop Star Assassin #1-12 (October, 2021 - TBA)
QUAD #1-16 (January, 2022 - TBA)
Follow Me Into the Darkness #1-4 (February, 2022 - May, 2022)
Heavy Metal Drummer #1-6 (February, 2022 - July, 2022)
Dark Beach #1-6 (April, 2022 - September, 2022)Sara Lone #1-4 (October, 2022 - January, 2023)

Sumerian Games

List of video games

References

External links 
 
 

American companies established in 2020
Comic book publishing companies of the United States
Companies based in Los Angeles
Publishing companies established in 2020
Video game companies established in 2020
Video game companies of the United States
Video game development companies